Los Canadienses is a 1976 documentary about the Canadian volunteers who fought in the Spanish Civil War. It was directed by Albert Kish and produced by Tom Daly and Colin Low  for the National Film Board of Canada. It won several awards, including the 1977 BAFTA Award for Best Documentary.

Synopsis
The Spanish Civil War (1936-1939) was a conflict between Spain's Nationalists, a right-wing alliance led by General Francisco Franco’s military junta, and Republicans, a left- and -centre wing group opposing the Nationalist overthrow of the constitutionally-elected government. Forty thousand volunteers from around the world traveled to Spain to fight in the war. Of all nationalities, only France saw more volunteers take part than Canada—1,200 Canadians joined the struggle as the XV International Brigade of the  Mackenzie–Papineau Battalion; over half were killed.

As it is illegal for civilian Canadians to participate in foreign wars, survivors were not recognized by military institutions, or in official Canadian histories. Kish sought to give them their due through this film which, though emotional and respectful, does not lapse into sentimentality.

Awards
 30th British Academy Film Awards, London: BAFTA Award for Best Documentary, 1977
 Chicago International Film Festival, Chicago: Silver Hugo Award, 1977
 Yorkton Film Festival, Yorkton, Saskatchewan: Golden Sheaf Award, Best Documentary, 1977
 Melbourne Film Festival, Melbourne: TV Award for Best Film Made for TV, 1977
 American Film and Video Festival, New York: Blue Ribbon, International History and Culture, 1977
 International Filmfestival Mannheim-Heidelberg, Mannheim: Special Mention from the Fédération internationale de la presse cinématographique, 1976
 International Filmfestival Mannheim-Heidelberg, Mannheim: Special Prize for the Best Film, 1976

References

BAFTA winners (films)
National Film Board of Canada documentaries
1976 documentary films
Films produced by Colin Low (filmmaker)
Documentary films about the Spanish Civil War
1970s Canadian films